The 2014–15 NHL Three Star Awards are the way the National Hockey League denotes its players of the week and players of the month of the 2014–15 season.

Weekly

Monthly

Rookie of the Month

See also
Three stars (ice hockey)
2014–15 NHL season
2014–15 NHL hat tricks
2014–15 NHL suspensions and fines
2014–15 NHL transactions
2014 NHL Entry Draft
2014 in sports
2015 in sports
2013–14 NHL Three Star Awards

References

Three Star Awards
Lists of NHL Three Star Awards